Vuča may refer to:
 General Vuča, a figure in Serbian epic poetry
 Vuča Žikić (died 1808), Serbian revolutionary
 Vuca, Berane Municipality, a village in Montenegro
 Vuca, Rožaje, a village in Montenegro

VUCA may refer to:
 Court of appeal of Vanuatu
 Volatility, uncertainty, complexity and ambiguity

See also 
 Vuka (disambiguation)